The National Assembly of the State of Eritrea has 150 members, 75 members appointed (consisting mostly of representatives elected by the general population, of whom at least 11 must be women, and 15 members representing Eritreans living abroad) and 75 members representing the members of the Central Committee of the People's Front for Democracy and Justice (PFDJ), the sole legal political party of Eritrea. According to the IPU, the National Assembly has 150 indirectly elected members. The National Assembly was composed in 1994, and its meeting place is located in Asmara.

AFP reported that Eritreans have elected 399 representatives in the country's six regions in a lengthy process that would lead to the formation of a constituent assembly, with the regional elections beginning on 4 January 1997 in some parts of the country and completed in others by 1 March 1997. , direct elections had never been held: elections planned for 2001 were continuously postponed before being cancelled altogether. , the National Assembly was described by the Office of the United Nations High Commissioner for Human Rights as non-existent, having not convened since January 2002. In practice, President Isaias Afwerki exercises legislative powers in addition to the executive functions granted by the constitution.

Background
While Eritrea was federated to Ethiopia, and later annexed from 1952–1962, the Eritrean Assembly was the legislative body. Eritrea has a one-party national Assembly governed by People's Front for Democracy and Justice (PFDJ) (originally the Eritrean People's Liberation Front (EPLF)). From the time of independence since May 1991, the country has been continuing with a transitional government elected during the elections in June 1993; the scheduled elections from 2001 have been postponed indefinitely.

The regional and local elections are conducted on a periodic basis on a restricted framework, with all men and women of any ethnic or religious background are eligible to vote. Only individuals, not parties, are allowed to contest the elections, which are presided over by representatives from PDFJ. Policy decisions must be focused on the party mandate.

Qualification
The composition of the 150 members of the National Assembly is members from the Central Committee members of the ruling PFDJ and 75 others elected from the 527 member Constituent Assembly in 1997. The elections were held for a transitional government to discuss and ratify the new constitution. The stipulation set for the 75 elected members were: a minimum of 11 women members and  minimum of 15 members representing expat Eritreans.

Constitutional powers
The President was to be elected by the members of the National Assembly for a five-year term, and a maximum of two terms, while the members of the National Assembly were to be elected directly by popular vote.

In May 1997, a new constitution was adopted, which enabled only the 75 elected members needed in the Assembly, while 75 others from the PFDJ were nominated from the Central Committee; the members of the transitional assembly were allowed to continue until next elections were held. The National Assembly was scheduled to meet every six months, or at points of emergency at the behest of President and two-thirds of the members. The Council of State reports to the Assembly, which was set as the top most legislative body of the Constitution of Eritrea that needs to assure the fundamental rights of the citizens of the country and to ensure justice, peace and stability. The National Assembly was also set to oversee the Executive branch of the constitution during the regime of the transitional government. The other major functions of the National Assembly include approval of budgets, governing domestic and foreign policies, and regulating the policies of the council.

See also
Politics of Eritrea
List of legislatures by country
Legislative branch

References

1992 establishments in Eritrea
Eritrea
Government of Eritrea
Eritrea
Eritrea